Betty Olivero (b. 16 May 1954) is an Israeli music educator and composer.

Biography
Olivero was born in Tel Aviv, Israel to parents Dora Kapon and Eli Olivero. She graduated with a Bachelor in Music from the Rubin Academy of Music at Tel Aviv University in 1978, where she studied with Ilona Vincze-Kraus for piano and Yizhak Sadai and Leon Schidlowsky for composition. She continued her studies at Yale University where she studied under Jacob Druckman, Bernard Rands and Gilbert Amy, and graduated with a Masters in Music in 1981.

She continued her studies in Florence with Luciano Berio from 1983 to 1986 and began her develop career as a composer in Europe. She married Raffaello Majoni and had two children, and returned to Israel in 2002 to take a position as professor of composition at Bar-Ilan University. In 2004 she became composer-in-residence at the Jerusalem Symphony Orchestra.

Olivero's music has been performed internationally by orchestras and ensembles including the BBC Symphony Orchestra, the Juilliard Ensemble, the Chicago Symphony Orchestra, the New York Philharmonic, the London Sinfonietta, the Israel Philharmonic Orchestra, the Israel Camerata and the Arditti Quartet.

Honors and awards
Leonard Bernstein scholarship
Fromm Music Foundation Award (U.S.A., 1986)
Koussevitzky Award (USA, 2000)
Prime Minister's Prize (Israel, 2001)
Rosenblum Award for the Performing Arts (Israel, 2003)
Landau Award for the Performing Arts (Israel, 2004)
ACUM Prize for lifetime achievement (Israel, 2004)

Works
Olivero composes for orchestra, chamber ensemble, solo instrument and voice. Selected works include:

Instrumental music
Pan, 5 flutes, 1984, revised, 1988
Batnun (Double Bass), double bass and chamber orchestra, 1985
Presenze, 10 instruments, 1986
Ketarim (Crowns), violin, orchestra, 1989
Adagio, chamber orchestra, 1990
Tenuot, orchestra 1990, revised, 1999
Sofim (Endings), piano, 1991
Per Viola, viola, 1993
Mareot (Mirrors), flute, violin, 1994
Carosello, string orchestra, percussion, children’s chamber orchestra, 1994
Kavei-avir (A Volo d’Uccello, Air Lines), 10 instruments, 1996
Der Golem (Suites Nos. 1 and 2), clarinet, string quartet, and clarinet, string orchestra (respectively) 1997–1998
Mizrach, clarinet, string orchestra, metal wind chimes, 1997
Kavei-or (Light Lines), orchestra, 1999
Merkavot (Chariots) orchestra, 1999
Bashrav, flute, clarinet, trumpet, percussion, piano/celeste, string quartet, 2004
Neharót Neharót (נהרות, נהרות) for solo viola, accordion, percussion, 2 string orchestras and tape (2006–2007)

Vocal music
Cantes Amargos, female voice and chamber orchestra, 1984
Makamat, 5 Middle-Eastern folk songs for female voice, 9 instruments, 1988
Behind the Wall, for puppet theatre, Mezzo, 8 instruments, 1989
Juego de Siempre (The Never-Ending Game), 12 folk songs in Ladino, female voice (alto), chamber orchestra or 7 instruments, 1991, revised 1994
Bakashot (Supplications), clarinet, choir, orchestra, 1996
Masken, Soprano, Mezzo, Bariton/narrator, violin, viola, cello, piano, percussion, 1999
Achot ketana (Little Sister), Soprano, 3 solo violins, string orchestra, clarinet, 2000
Hosha’anot, soprano, orchestra, 2000, revised 2003
Serafim (Angels), Soprano, violin, clarinet, cello, piano, 2002
Zimaar, Soprano, 2 violins, cello, harpsichord, percussion, 2003
L’Ombra che porta il sogno (The Shadow That Brings Dreams), 2005

Discography
Olivero's works have been recorded and issued on CD, including:
Cantigas Sephardies, Folkways Records, 1985
Makamat, CD- Ricordi, 1989
Juego de Siempre, Beth Hatefutsoth Museum, Tel Aviv, 1991
Shtiler, Shtiler; Mode ani for Clarinet, Mezzo-Soprano and mixed choir, Pläne 1995
Bakashot, Koch-Schwann, 1996
Der Golem: Suite No. 1, and Der Golem: 6 Yidishe Lieder un Tantz for Clarinet and String Quartet, Pläne 1997
Mizrach, Pläne, 1998
Achot ketana, Angel, 2001
Sofim, (Israeli Music Center, ACUM), 2003

References

1954 births
Living people
20th-century classical composers
Israeli women composers
Women classical composers
Jewish classical composers
Israeli music educators
20th-century Israeli educators
20th-century Israeli women musicians
21st-century Israeli educators
21st-century Israeli women musicians
Women music educators
20th-century women composers
20th-century women educators
21st-century women educators